São João Batista is a former civil parish in the municipality of Porto de Mós, Portugal. The population in 2011 was 3,144, in an area of 16.18 km2. On 28 January 2013 it merged with São Pedro to form Porto de Mós.

References 

Former parishes of Porto de Mós